Vanthology: A Tribute to Van Morrison is the third tribute album for the songs of Northern Irish singer-songwriter Van Morrison. It was released in August 2003.

Track listing
All songs by Van Morrison

"Tupelo Honey"  performed by Little Milton – 4:39
"Jackie Wilson Said (I'm in Heaven When You Smile)" performed by Syl Johnson – 2:53
"Have I Told You Lately" performed by William Bell – 4:08
"Brown Eyed Girl" performed by Freddie Scott – 3:40
"Into the Mystic" performed by Frederick Knight – 4:00
"Real Real Gone"  performed by Bettye LaVette – 4:04
"Crazy Love" performed by Eddie Floyd – 2:52
"Gloria" performed by Sir Mack Rice – 4:20
"Warm Love" performed by Otis Clay – 3:00
"Queen of the Slipstream" performed by Son Seals – 3:54
"Bright Side of the Road" performed by Dan Penn – 3:44
"My Lonely Sad Eyes" performed by Bobby Patterson – 2:48
"I Like It Like That" performed by Henry Butler – 4:34
"Bulbs" performed by Ellis Hooks – 4:16
"Moondance" performed by Chuck Jackson – 4:52

Personnel
Henry Butler – organ, piano
Simon Kirke – drums, percussion
Sally Tiven – bass guitar, backing vocals 
Jon Tiven – electric and acoustic guitars 
Ellis Hooks – backing vocals
Alan Merrill – backing vocals
Lauren Singer – backing vocals

Additional Musicians
Mason Casey – harmonica on "I Like It Like That", "Moondance", "Gloria" and "Into the Mystic" 
Marvin Floyd – organ on "Brown Eyed Girl"
Paul Ossola – double bass on "Moondance"
Little Milton – lead guitar on "Tupelo Honey"
Son Seals – lead guitar on "Queen of the Slipstream"
Eddie Floyd – backing vocals on "Crazy Love"
Dan Penn – harmony vocals on "Bright Side of the Road"
On "Gloria"
Paul Randolph – bass
Michael Gibes – drums
Paul Carey – guitar
Mason Casey – backing vocals
Jon Tiven – backing vocals
Sir Mack Rice – backing vocals
Shadow Morton – backing vocals
On "I Like It Like That"
Christa Haskett – backing vocals 
Yuko Ichioka – backing vocals
Georgina Graper Moore – backing vocals

Production
Art Direction and Design: Stephen Jensen
Cover Illustration: Joni Bishop 
Project Coordination: Linda Scoma 
Production: Jon Tiven
Arrangements: Sally Tiven
Engineering: Joe Johnson

External links
Reviews and album information

2003 compilation albums
Van Morrison tribute albums